Hettiarachchi Gamage Jeevantha Mahesh Kulatunga (born 2 November 1973), or Jeevantha Kulatunga is a former Sri Lankan T20I cricketer. An aggressive right-handed middle order batsman, Kulatunga has been captain of Colts Cricket Club since 2003–2004, though he failed to make an impact in international level.

He is a past student of Maliyadeva College, Kurunegala. He is also a member of 2007 Hong Kong Cricket Sixes winning Sri Lanka team.

Domestic career
Born in Kurunegala, Kulatunga was 17 when he made his first class debut in 1990, playing for Kurunegala Youth Cricket Club. In 2001 he was selected to represent the Sri Lanka Board President's XI in a game against England at Matara, scoring a half century. He has also played for Sri Lanka A, in games against Pakistan A and India.

He has been a prolific scorer in domestic cricket and in May steered his club Wayamba to a 31-run victory in the inaugural Inter-Provincial Twenty20 final against Ruhuna, earning an opportunity to make his international debut. He has also played for Barisal Blazers in Bangladesh's NCL T20 Bangladesh.

International career
In October 2008, Kulatunga was selected in the Sri Lanka side for an International Twenty20 tournament in Toronto. He made his debut on 20 October against Zimbabwe, scoring eight runs and taking a catch in a five-wicket victory, also playing against Canada.

Fixing allegations 

Jeevantha Kulatunga was suspected by Al Jazeera along with Dilhara Lokuhettige for being involved in a match fixing in a fake T20 series in the United Arab Emirates. However, in a latest release on 28 May 2018, Jeevantha Kulatunga has declined the allegations made by Al Jazeera, stating that this is a planned action against him in order to damage his reputation.

The Al Jazeera's Investigation Unit also revealed that former Pakistani cricketer Hasan Raza, Jeevantha Kulatunga and Dilhara Lokuhettige were preparing to make money by organising and arranging a fake tournament in the UAE solely to make huge collection of money to fix matches in the future.

References

External links
 

1973 births
Living people
Sri Lankan cricketers
Sri Lanka Twenty20 International cricketers
Colts Cricket Club cricketers
Wayamba cricketers
Basnahira cricketers
Uva cricketers
North Central Province cricketers
Kandurata Warriors cricketers
Sri Lanka Cricket Combined XI cricketers
Alumni of Maliyadeva College
Cricketers at the 2010 Asian Games
Sportspeople from Kurunegala
Sri Lankan cricket coaches
Barisal Division cricketers
Asian Games competitors for Sri Lanka